John Orchard (1928–1995) was an English actor.

John Orchard may also refer to:

John Orchard (Australian politician) (1906–1995)
John Orchard (MP) for Hereford (fl. 1417), English politician
John Bernard Orchard (1910–2006), monk, teacher and theologian
John Orchard (doctor) (born 1967), Australian sport and exercise medicine physician